Chordodidae is a family of parasitic horsehair worms belonging to the order Gordioidea; its taxonomy is under review.

Genera
Two subfamilies are currently recognised; unless referenced otherwise, the Global Biodiversity Information Facility includes the following genera:

Chordodinae
Auth. Heinze, 1935
 Chordodes Creplin, 1847
 Dacochordodes Capuse, 1965
 Euchordodes Heinze, 1937
 Lanochordodes Kirjanova, 1950
 Neochordodes Carvalho, 1942
 Noteochordodes Miralles and Villalobos, 2000
 Pantachordodes Heinze, 1954
 Pseudochordodes Carvalho, 1942
 Spinochordodes Kirjanova, 1950

Paragordiinae

 Digordius Kirjanova, 1950
 Paragordius Camerano, 1897
 Progordius Kirjanova, 1950
 Pseudogordius Yeh and Jordan, 1957

incertae sedis
 Beatogordius Heinze, 1934
 †Cretachordodes Poinar & Buckley, 2006
 Gordionus Müller, 1927
 Parachordodes Camerano, 1897
 Paragordionus Heinze, 1935
 Semigordionus Heinze, 1952

References

External links
 

Nematomorpha